Benjamin Holmes (August 8, 1846 – January 14, 1914) was a Democratic Mayor of Kansas City, Missouri 1890–1891.

He was the first mayor under a new charter allowing for two-year terms and oversaw the design and construction of the George Kessler-designed parkway system.

Was born in Independence, Missouri; operated the livestock commission firm of Lail & Holmes at the Kansas City Livestock Exchange building; was treasurer of Jackson County, Missouri from 1878 to 1885.

Holmes was buried in Elmwood Cemetery.

References

1846 births
1914 deaths
19th-century American politicians
Mayors of Kansas City, Missouri